Henry Garland Dupré (July 28, 1873 – February 21, 1924) was from 1910 to 1924 a Democratic member of the United States House of Representatives for Louisiana's 2nd congressional district, based about New Orleans, Louisiana.

Born in Opelousas in St. Landry Parish in south Louisiana, Dupré attended public schools and graduated in 1892 from Tulane University in New Orleans and thereafter the Tulane University Law School. In 1895, he was admitted to the bar and began his law practice in New Orleans.

He served as assistant city attorney of New Orleans from 1900 to 1910. During that same period, he was the District 14 member of the Louisiana House of Representatives for Orleans Parish. He was House Speaker from 1908 to 1910. In 1908, he chaired the Louisiana Democratic State Convention.

Dupré was elected to the Sixty-first Congress to fill the vacancy caused by the death of Samuel Louis Gilmore. He was reelected to the Sixty-second and to the six succeeding Congresses and served from November 8, 1910, until his death in Washington, D.C., on February 21, 1924. He is interred at the Catholic Cemetery in his native Opelousas.

See also

List of United States Congress members who died in office (1900–49)

References

1873 births
1924 deaths
People from Opelousas, Louisiana
Politicians from New Orleans
Tulane University alumni
Tulane University Law School alumni
Democratic Party members of the Louisiana House of Representatives
Speakers of the Louisiana House of Representatives
Democratic Party members of the United States House of Representatives from Louisiana
Lawyers from New Orleans
Burials in Louisiana
Catholics from Louisiana
19th-century American lawyers